Ronaldsway Halt (Manx: Stadd Roonysvaie) is a request stop on the Isle of Man Railway between Castletown and Ballasalla at Ronaldsway, near the Isle of Man Airport. Passengers wishing to board the train here can signal the driver to stop the train; to alight from the train the guard must be notified in advance.

Location and environs
The halt is situated behind the Ronaldsway Industrial Estate beside the Silverburn River at the midway point between the stations at Ballasalla and Castletown. Ronaldsway is the site of the Battle of Ronaldsway in 1275, which saw the Isle of Man transfer from Norse rule to Scottish rule; keills were excavated here and these now form part of historical displays at the Story Of Mann in Douglas. On the west side of the halt is a large field known as the Great Meadow which was once a horse racing track and later played host to the island's annual southern agricultural show; there were special trains for both these events.

History
The halt was introduced in 1967, to compete for airport traffic with buses and taxis. At that time there was just a simple nameboard, and the halt was mentioned only intermittently in timetables. As part of a major overhaul of the entire line as part of an all-island sewerage network in 2001, a pipeline was laid beneath the railway line and the permanent way completely replaced, the halt received a small waiting platform consisting of built up sleepers.

Traffic

Because of the short walk from the airport, air passengers leave and board trains here; it is also a popular drop-off spot for walkers, being close to the Millennium Way footpath established in 1979.

Nameboard
The halt's name is that of the nearby airport. For the 1971 season only it was re-titled as Great Meadow Halt in reference to the large field and one-time race course that lies adjacent to the halt.  When bilingual Manx/English nameboards were introduced on the line, a replacement nameboard was added in 2009 showing the Manx Gaelic name of Staad Roonysvie and is still there today.

Route

See also
 Isle of Man Railway stations
 Ronaldsway
 Isle of Man Airport

References

 James I.C. Boyd Isle Of Man Railway, Volume 3, The Routes & Rolling Stock (1996) 
 Norman Jones Scenes from the Past: Isle of Man Railway (1994) 
 Robert Hendry Rails in the Isle of Man: A Colour Celebration (1993) 
 A.M Goodwyn Manx Transport Kaleidoscope, 2nd Edition (1995)

External links
 Castletown Station
 Isle Of Man Guide
 Online Reference Guide

Railway stations in the Isle of Man
Railway stations opened in 1967
Airport railway stations
1967 establishments in the Isle of Man